Henry Tucker was the most powerful merchant in Sherbro, Sierra Leone in the eighteenth century. 

He was one of the Sherbro Tuckers and ruled at Bahol.

References

18th-century Sierra Leonean people
Sierra Leonean businesspeople
People from Bonthe District
Year of birth missing
Year of death missing